James Schaben (May 10, 1926 – August 3, 2013) was an American politician who served in the Iowa Senate from 1967 to 1975.

He died on August 3, 2013, in Omaha, Nebraska at age 87.

References

1926 births
2013 deaths
Democratic Party Iowa state senators
People from Shelby County, Iowa